Palak Muchhal (born 30 March 1992)  is an Indian singer and lyricist from Indore, Madhya Pradesh. She and her younger brother Palash Muchhal perform stage shows across India and abroad to raise funds for the poor children who need financial assistance for the medical treatment of heart diseases.

Muchhal also performs as a playback singer for Bollywood films and other Indian film industries. She has rendered her voice in Hindi films such as Ek Tha Tiger (2012), Aashiqui 2 (2013), Kick (2014) and Action Jackson (2014) Prem Ratan Dhan Payo (2015) M.S. Dhoni: The Untold Story (2016) Kaabil (2017), Baaghi 2 (2018) and Pal Pal Dil Ke Paas (2019). Her rendition of the song Kaun tujhe" from the film"M.S. Dhoni: The Untold Story has earned her much praise from fans as well as prominent personalities in the music industry. On 6 November 2022, she married music composer Mithoon, with whom she had earlier worked on the soundtrack of Aashiqui 2.

Background

Palak Muchhal was born on 30 March 1992 into a Maheshwari Marwari family in Indore. Her mother, Amita Muchhal, is a homemaker and her father, Rajkumar Muchhal, works for a private firm. She has a younger brother, Palash Muchhal. She did her schooling from Queens College Indore. In May 2013 Muchhal stated that she was doing her final year of B.Com from a college in Indore.

Charity work

1997–2000
 
Muchhal became a member of Kalyanji-Anandji Little Star, a group of young singers, when she was four years old. During the Kargil War of 1999, when aged seven, she spent a week singing at shops in her home city, Indore, to raise funds for the families of deceased Indian soldiers. Her efforts received substantial coverage in Indian media and she raised 25,000 (US$810). Later that year, she sang to raise funds for victims of the 1999 Odisha cyclone.

Her decision to use her voice to help others was triggered when she saw poor children using their clothes to clean train compartments. Around the same time, teachers at Nidhi Bal Vinay Mandir, an Indore-based school, approached Muchhal and her parents with a request for a charity show to raise funds for their pupil, Lokesh, who was suffering from a congenital heart defect. Lokesh's father was an impoverished footwear shop-owner and was unable to afford the high cost of heart surgery. Muchhal and her parents agreed to arrange a show and in March 2000, she used a street vendor's cart as a stage for the event and collected 51,000 (US$1,600) towards the cost of surgery. The attendant publicity prompted Bangalore-based cardiologist, Devi Prasad Shetty, to operate on Lokesh free of charge. Muchhal's parents published advertisements in local newspapers to promote donations toward heart surgery for children like Lokesh. The outcome of this was a list of 33 children in need of heart surgery.

A series of charity shows were arranged later in that year, from which 225,000 (US$7,200) were raised. This money was used to provide heart surgery for five children in Bangalore and Bhandari Hospital Indore. To help Muchhal in her efforts to save lives of children at relatively low cost, T. Choithram Hospital of Indore halved the cost of surgery from 80,000 (US$2,600) to 40,000 (US$1,300) and one of its surgeons, Dhiraj Gandhi, decided to waive his fee for cases brought in by Muchhal.

2001–2010

Since 2000, Muchhal has travelled extensively in India and abroad for her charity show, which is billed in Hindi as "Dil Se Dil Tak" ("From heart to heart") and in English as "Save Little Hearts". Her younger brother, Palash, performs in the same shows with the intent of raising funds for children who have kidney ailments. On average, Muchhal sings around 40 songs in each show which includes popular Bollywood songs, Ghazals and Bhajans. Muchhal can sing in 17 different languages which includes Hindi, Sanskrit, Gujarati, Odia, Assamese, Rajasthani, Bengali, Bhojpuri, Punjabi, Marathi, Kannada, Telugu, Tamil, Sindhi and Malayalam.

Palak was also a star at Maheboob College, Secunderabad and sang there, both Palak and Palash sang on different occasions, by this they were bought up and built their career.

In 2001 Muchhal, raised around one million rupees for the victims of 2001 Gujarat earthquake. In July 2003, Muchhal offered financial assistance through her charity funds to parents of a two-year-old Pakistani girl who had a hole in the heart. Muchhal's charity organisation is named as "Palak Muchhal Heart Foundation".  this foundation had financially assisted 200 children in undergoing heart surgery. By the end of the year 2006 Muchhal had raised  for this foundation which were used to save lives of 234 children. To ensure that operations of children do not stop due to lack of money, Bhandari Hospital in Indore has allowed an overdraft of up to one million rupees to Palak Muchhal Heart Foundation. In 2006 Muchhal was one of the five heroic stories broadcast by Star Gold channel as part of its "Rang De Basanti Salaam" (Salute to Color of Sacrifice) initiative. By June 2009 Muchhal had staged 1,460 charity shows across the world which had raised  for Palak Muchhal Heart Foundation. These funds helped to save the lives of 338 children.

Doctors allow Muchhal to be present in the operating theatre. She has her own surgical gown in the hospital and when the operation takes place she chants Jain Navkar Mantra. Muchhal and her parents do not receive any financial benefits from the charity shows but she receives a doll for every child whose life she helps make better through her efforts.

2011–present

In 2011, Muchhal entered in Bollywood as professional playback singer but her efforts to help child heart patients continued.  In August 2015, funds raised by her has helped to save the lives of 800 children.  As of October 2020, she with her brother has saved 2,200 lives of children.

Bollywood career

Muchhal released six non-filmi albums prior to her adulthood. In 2001, when she was nine, her first album "Child For Children" was released by Tips Music. In 2003, her second album Palken was released. In later years she released her other albums Aao Tumhe Chand Per Le Jaaye, Beti Hu Mahakal Ki, and Dil Ke Liye. In 2011, her Jai Jai Dev Ganesh album was released by T-Series. Muchhal moved to Mumbai from Indore in late 2006 to find opportunities in Bollywood for her singing career. She sang her first Bollywood song for the October 2011 movie Damadamm!, receiving generally positive reviews. She sang her second song, "Pyaar Ke Silsile", a month later for movie Na Jaane Kabse. The music in Na Jaane Kabse, and the movie also, received bad reviews. Muchhal was an acquaintance of actor Salman Khan. Khan had recommended her name earlier to music director Sajid–Wajid for his film Veer. Khan had also recommended her name to Yash Raj Banner. Following this, Muchhal dubbed the song "Laapata" with KK for Yash Raj banner which was included in 2012 blockbuster movie Ek Tha Tiger. The song was filmed on Salman Khan and Katrina Kaif. The song was a hit and introduced her to Bollywood.

Later that year in 2012 she sang "Nainon Ne Nainon Se" song for the movie From Sydney with Love, receiving favorable reviews. In early 2013, Muchhal sang two songs, composed by Mithoon and Jeet Gannguli, for the movie Aashiqui 2. Aashiqui 2 music received generally positive reviews, becoming her second hit after Ek Tha Tiger with the song "Chahun Main Yaa Na" becoming her special signature start to the Bollywood industry. Muchhal has also sung a song "Tui Borsha Bikeler Dheu" in Bengali for the April 2013 Bengali movie Rocky. After her debut as a singer in Bollywood, she sang several songs of Himesh Reshammiya's composition. In 2014, she sang with Mika Singh for Reshammiya's song "Jumme Ki Raat", which became the biggest hit of the year. Later she also sang the same with Salman Khan. She was also the lead singer in the 2015 Salman Khan film Prem Ratan Dhan Payo. In 2016, she lent her voice for "Kaun Tujhe" of Amaal Mallik in M.S. Dhoni: The Untold Story, one of the top female songs of the year. Most of her songs until date are compositions of Reshammiya, Gannguli, Mithoon and Amaal Mallik. Her Kannada song "Enammi Enammi" with Vijay Prakash was a big chartbuster in 2018.

Discography

Hindi film songs

Hindi non-film songs

Songs in other languages

Bengali songs

Telugu songs

Kannada songs

Tamil songs

Marathi songs

Gujarati songs

Punjabi songs

Bhojpuri songs

Urdu songs

Personal life
Palak Muchhal married Mithoon, a music composer on 6 November 2022 with whom she worked earlier on Aashiqui 2 Album.

Honours and awards

Silver Medal for the year 2000 by Vice-President of India Krishan Kant as National Child Award For Exceptional Achievement (Rashtriya Bal Puraskar).
Winner of Sony Entertainment Television (India) TV show Cadbury Bournvita Confidence Champions (2006)
Muchhal has made her entry in both Guinness Book of World Records and Limca Book of World Records for great achievements in social work.
CBSE and Maharashtra board has included Palak's achievement in the textbook of seventh standard moral science.
Zee Cine Awards 2014 Sa Re Ga Ma Pa Fresh Singing Talent for "Meri Aashiqui" song of Aashiqui 2 and also a nomination in Best Female Playback Singer category for the same song.
Stardust Award for Best Female Playback Singer for the title track of Prem Ratan Dhan Payo in 2015.
Got her first-ever nomination in the Filmfare Awards through 61st Filmfare Awards in 2016 as a playback singer for the same song and category. 
BIG Star Entertainment Awards for BIG Star Most Entertaining Singer (Female) for the same. 
Her contribution resulted in winning Best Track of the Year Award 2015 for "Prem Ratan Dhan Payo" song in Zee Cine Awards.
Received her first ever Screen Award for "Kaun Tujhe Yun Pyaar Karega" _ M. S. Dhoni: The Untold Story in December 2016.
Second nomination in Filmfares through 62nd Filmfare Awards 2017 for "Kaun Tujhe" once again.
Became a judge in The Voice India Kids 2017 _ &TV with Himesh Reshammiya, Shaan (singer) and Papon, and ultimately a contestant (from "Palak's Team") won the title even after facing a critical stage of her life as a minor girl 'about her modesty issues'.
Received the Honorary Doctorate by the American University, United States for Global Peace (2021)

References

External links

Palak Muchhal at Bollywood Hungama

1992 births
Living people
Hindi-language singers
Indian women playback singers
Bollywood playback singers
Singers from Bihar
Actresses from Patna
Indian women activists
Women musicians from Bihar
21st-century Indian singers
21st-century Indian women singers
Indian human rights activists
Indian philanthropists
Indian women philanthropists
21st-century Indian actresses
Activists from Bihar
Musicians from Patna
Indian folk-pop singers
Indian child singers
Screen Awards winners